Andreas Hykade (born 1968 in Altötting, Bavaria) is a German animator, cartoonist, and voice actor.  Before studying at the Academy of Fine Arts in Stuttgart from 1988 to 1990, he attended König-Karlmann-Gymnasium Altötting. He worked as an animator in London in 1991, then studied animation at the Filmakademie Baden-Württemberg until 1995. Since then he works as animation director, partly at "Studio Filmbilder" in Stuttgart, and as the Professor for Animation at the Filmakademie Baden-Württemberg.

Hykade's trademark style is based on very simple characters which move in smooth animation. Sometimes, like in the two music videos for Gigi D'Agostino, there's just a line over a flat color, much like the classical La Linea-character of Osvaldo Cavandoli (to which they are a loving homage). Often his characters feature single strokes as arms and legs, in this Hykade is similar to German comic artist , or the Diary of a Wimpy Kid books by Jeff Kinney.

"We Lived in Grass" (1995) is a student film and Hykade's first part of  The Country Trilogy. The set of the film is a place just two streets away from the end of the world. The film is told from the point of view of a little boy. "All women is whore and all men is soldier," the father of the boy says. "So go into Grass and kill a tiger for the best tits you can find." As the father gets testicular cancer, a journey into Grass for the young hero begins. We lived in Grass won numerous awards including the German short film Price.

"Ring of Fire" (2000) is the second part of The Country Trilogy. It is set in a bright and shining bazaar of sexual desires. The film is describing an archaic Machomyth and the desire of two cowboys to break with this myth. "Ring of Fire" won countless awards including the Grand Price at the Ottawa Animation Festival.

In 1995, Hykade, along with Gil Alkabetz and Film Bilder, were commissioned to do a series of network ID's and commercials for Nickelodeon UK.

"The Runt" (2006) is Hykade's third and final part of The Country Trilogy. The once dead father of "We Lived in Grass" returns. "I give you the runt," he says. "But you take care of it and you kill it next year." With "The Runt", Hykade finished what he calls his early work.

Since 2008, Hykade has taught animation at Harvard University. In 2019, he was invited to join the Academy of Motion Picture Arts and Sciences.

Filmography 
 "The King is Dead" (1990)
 "We Lived in Grass" (1995)
 "Zehn kleine Jägermeister" (1996, music video for German band Die Toten Hosen)
 "The Riddle" (1999, music video for Italian DJ Gigi D'Agostino)
 "Bla Bla Bla" (1999, music video for Italian DJ Gigi D'Agostino)
 "Ring of Fire" (2000)
 "Time" (2002, TV mini series)
 "Tom and the slice of bread with strawberry jam and honey 1-13" (2003-2016 TV series)
 "Walkampf" (2004, music video for German band Die Toten Hosen)
 "The Runt" (2005)
 "Rocket Boy and Toro" (2008-2009 TV series, served as the lead character designer but remained uncredited)
 "Love & Theft" (2010)
 "Nuggets" (2015)
 "Myself"  (2015)
 "Altötting" (2020, Co-production with the National Film Board of Canada and Ciclope Filmes.)

References

External links 
 Andreas Hykade's Website
 
 AWN
 Studio Film Bilder

1968 births
Living people
Harvard University faculty
Mass media people from Bavaria
German animated film directors
Animation educators
People from Altötting